De Vere Mews consists of 18 Grade II listed mews houses in Kensington, London W8, probably built in the mid-19th century.

De Vere Mews lies to the rear of the southern end of the east side of De Vere Gardens, and is entered via Canning Place.

References

External links
 

Grade II listed buildings in the Royal Borough of Kensington and Chelsea
Kensington
Grade II listed houses in London
Houses completed in the 19th century